Xenodermidae is a family of snakes native to East Asia, South Asia, and Southeast Asia. They are secretive, probably nocturnal, and typically inhabit moist forest habitats. They seem to be opportunistic carnivores, preying on other vertebrates.

The correct spelling of the family name is Xenodermidae, not "Xenodermatidae".

Taxonomy and systematics
Xenodermidae have a basal position in the colubroid radiation. However, their exact position is not yet settled, e.g., that they might be the sister taxon of the rest of Colubroidea, or that their sister taxon is Acrochordidae, and that these two families together form a clade that is the sister taxon for the Colubroidea.

Genera
The family consists of the following 6 genera:
Achalinus 
Fimbrios 
Parafimbrios 
Paraxenodermus 
Stoliczkia 
Xenodermus

References

 
Reptile families
Taxa named by John Edward Gray